Christophe Lambert (born 23 February 1987) is a Swiss footballer who plays as a defender for AC Bellinzona.

External links

1987 births
Living people
Swiss men's footballers
FC Luzern players
AC Bellinzona players
Swiss Super League players
Association football defenders
Sportspeople from Nidwalden